The Carteret School District is a comprehensive community public school district that serves students in pre-kindergarten through twelfth grade from Carteret, in Middlesex County, New Jersey, United States.

As of the 2021–22 school year, the district, comprised of five schools, had an enrollment of 3,882 students and 305.4 classroom teachers (on an FTE basis), for a student–teacher ratio of 12.7:1.

The district is classified by the New Jersey Department of Education as being in District Factor Group "B", the second-lowest of eight groupings. District Factor Groups organize districts statewide to allow comparison by common socioeconomic characteristics of the local districts. From lowest socioeconomic status to highest, the categories are A, B, CD, DE, FG, GH, I and J.

History
In 2016, borough voters turned down a ballot proposal to switch from an elected school board to an appointed board.

In September 2019, voters approved a referendum by a nearly 3-1 margin that would spend $37 million, including $7.4 million in state aid, for the construction of a new junior high school for 600 students in grades seven and eight, as well as expansion and renovation projects in all of the five existing school facilities.

Schools
Schools in the district (with 2021–22 enrollment data from the National Center for Education Statistics) are:
Elementary schools
Columbus School with 708 students in grades PreK–5
Mayling Cardenas, Principal
Nathan Hale School with 460 students in grades PreK–5
Erika Barrett, Principal
Private Nicholas Minue School with 638 students in grades PreK–5
Cheryl Bolinger, Principal
Middle school
Carteret Middle School with 914 students in grades 6–8
Merita Euell, Principal
High school
Carteret High School with 1,009 students in grades 9–12
Joanna Joaquin, Principal

Administration
Core members of the district's administration are:
Rosa L. Diaz, Superintendent of Schools
Carmela Collazo, Business Administrator / Board Secretary

Board of education
The district's board of education is comprised of nine members who set policy and oversee the fiscal and educational operation of the district through its administration. As a Type II school district, the board's trustees are elected directly by voters to serve three-year terms of office on a staggered basis, with three seats up for election each year held (since 2012) as part of the November general election. The board appoints a superintendent to oversee the district's day-to-day operations and a business administrator to supervise the business functions of the district.

References

External links
Carteret School District

Data for the Carteret School District, National Center for Education Statistics

Carteret, New Jersey
New Jersey District Factor Group B
School districts in Middlesex County, New Jersey